Steve Barclay (born December 13, 1944) is an American race car driver who competed in the American Racing Series and attempted rookie orientation for the 1990 Indianapolis 500.

Motorsports Career Results

American Open-Wheel

American Racing Series
(key)

References

External links 
 

Living people
1944 births
Sportspeople from Orange, California
Racing drivers from California
Indy Lights drivers